Lucile M. Jones (born 1955) is a seismologist and public voice for earthquake science and earthquake safety in California. One of the foremost and trusted public authorities on earthquakes, Jones is viewed by many in Southern California as the "seismologist-next-door," who is frequently called up on to provide information on recent earthquakes.

She is currently a research associate at the Seismological Laboratory at Caltech and chief scientist and founder of the Dr. Lucy Jones Center for Science and Society. She was previously at the US Geological Survey from 1985 to 2016, where she conducted research in the areas of foreshocks, seismotectonics, and the application of hazards science to improve societal resilience after natural disasters. At USGS, she was also part of the team of scientists that developed the Great Shakeout Earthquake Drills, during which millions around the world participate in annual earthquake safety drills.

Scientific career
Jones has authored over 100 papers on research seismology with primary interest in the physics of earthquakes, foreshocks and earthquake hazard assessment, and the seismotectonics (earthquake-producing geologic structures) of southern California. Jones received a Bachelor of Arts degree in Chinese language and literature, magna cum laude, from Brown University in 1976 and a Ph.D. in geophysics from the Massachusetts Institute of Technology in 1981.  She visited China in February 1979 in order to study the 1975 Haicheng earthquake, which had apparently been successfully predicted by the Chinese authorities based on an analysis of its foreshock sequence.  In doing so, she became one of the first United States scientists to enter China following the normalization of relations between the two countries.  She is a past Secretary of the Seismology Section of the American Geophysical Union, and past director and past chair of the publications committee of the Seismological Society of America.

Jones served as the Science Advisor for Risk Reduction for the USGS Natural Hazards Mission Area, as part of the SAFRR Project. She also worked as a Commissioner of the California Seismic Safety Commission (CSSC), which advises the governor and legislature on seismic safety, by appointment of Governor Gray Davis in 2002 and reappointment by Governor Arnold Schwarzenegger in 2005 and served on the California Earthquake Prediction Evaluation Council. In January 2014, she entered into a partnership on behalf of the USGS with the City of Los Angeles to serve as Seismic Risk Advisor to Mayor Eric Garcetti.

After retiring from the USGS in 2016, Jones founded the Dr. Lucy Jones Center for Science and Society and wrote a book published in 2018 titled The Big Ones: How Natural Disasters Have Shaped Us (and What We Can Do About Them). In the book, Jones chronicles some of the world's greatest natural disasters, such as volcanic eruptions, earthquakes, floods, and hurricanes, and analyzes how people have responded to them in order to understand how future crises can be survived.

Jones was in residence at the University of Oregon's Wayne Morse Center for Law and Politics as the Wayne Morse Chair, where she provided public talks on disaster preparedness and science communication.

Public outreach 
Since 1986, Jones has given many interviews to the press on behalf of the US Geological Survey following significant earthquakes in southern California.  In many media appearances, she worked together with fellow Caltech seismologist, Kate Hutton. In a 2004 profile of Jones, Tom Jordan of the USGS was quoted as saying, "Lucy provides Southern California — and the nation — with a very calming voice and an authoritative voice to the public's inquiry in disaster."  He also said that her high public profile may make her "one of the most effective chairs of CSSC ever".

Public perception of Jones as a voice of calm and reassurance has been attributed, in part, to an incident following the 1992 Joshua Tree earthquake in which she answered press questions while holding her sleeping child in her arms.  In a 2011 interview, Jones denied the story that she asked the press to be quiet so as not to wake her son.  She also expressed some regret that she became a symbol that "women can have it all".

In 2015, Jones was embedded at Los Angeles City Hall, a move by the USGS that Caltech's Tom Heaton credited with the September passage of a retrofitting plan that would increase seismic survivability of over 15,000 structures largely built of non-ductile concrete.

Covid-19 
In light of her reputation as a respected and trusted authority on earthquakes, Jones has been called upon for her comments regarding other natural disasters and crises, such as the COVID-19 pandemic. According to Jones, in a crisis, the public is best served when they are given "one clear message" to minimize the possibility of overwhelming or confusing people. And for the COVID-19 pandemic, that message, says Jones, is "[d]on't share your air" by wearing a mask and maintaining physical distance.

Climate change 
In 2022, Jones founded an initiative called "Tempo: Music for Climate Action" to encourage climate scientists, social scientists, and musicians to gather and explore climate issues.

Selected awards 
Jones has received the Alquist Award from the California Earthquake Safety Foundation, the Shoemaker Award for Lifetime Achievements in Science Communication from the USGS, the Samuel J. Heyman Service to America Medal from the Partnership for Public Service in 2015, and the Seismological Society of America's Frank Press Public Service Award in 2018.

Personal
Jones, a fourth-generation resident of southern California, currently lives in Pasadena, California. She is married to fellow seismologist Egill Hauksson and they have two sons.

Jones is a musician and composer, who plays a Renaissance stringed instrument called the viol. She is a member of Los Angeles Baroque, which calls itself "LA's Community Baroque Orchestra." In 2019, Jones released a music video accompanying a piece she composed called In Nomine Terra Calens, which translates to “In the Name of a Warming Earth.” In Nomine Terra Calens is her musical interpretation of global temperature data from 1880 to 2017, which shows an increase at what Jones calls a "terrifying" rate. In February 2019, Los Angeles Baroque performed In Nomine Terra Calens at the Natural History Museum of Los Angeles County.

References

External links 

  Lucy Jones speaking on the expected CA ‘Big One’ and the needed preparations, December 2013
2015 SCEC Annual Meeting Honoree: Lucy Jones – Southern California Earthquake Center
Dr. Lucy Jones Center for Science and Society
The Great ShakeOut
Southern California Seismic Network
Los Angeles Baroque

1955 births
Living people
20th-century American geologists
20th-century American women scientists
21st-century American geologists
21st-century American scientists
21st-century American women scientists
American geophysicists
American seismologists
American women geologists
Brown University alumni
Massachusetts Institute of Technology School of Science alumni
People from Pasadena, California
Scientists from California
United States Geological Survey personnel
Women geophysicists